Yitimu (also Romanized as Yītīmū) is a village in Khorrami Rural District, in the Central District of Khorrambid County, Fars Province, Iran. At the 2006 census, its population was 16, in 6 families.

References 

Populated places in Khorrambid County